Tithraustes quinquepunctata is a moth of the family Notodontidae. It is found in Panama.

Adults have a contrasting white and chocolate-brown wing pattern.

References

Moths described in 1901
Notodontidae of South America